Prosphaerosyllis modinouae is a small marine worm which belongs to the Annelida phylum. It was originally found in the North Falklands Basin, at a depth of 450 m. The species is named after Ivvet Modinou, a volcanologist and science communicator.

The species has protrusions along the sides of its body in between the parapodia. It has three small pear-shaped antennae, as well as two pairs of red eyes.

References

External links
WORMS entry

Syllidae
Animals described in 2020